Bugiano is a frazione of the comune of Cerreto di Spoleto in the Province of Perugia, Umbria, central Italy. It stands at an elevation of 686 metres above sea level. At the time of the Istat census of 2001 it had 36 inhabitants.

External links 
 Provincia di Perugia homepage

References 

Frazioni of the Province of Perugia